The Wassenaar Arrangement on Export Controls for Conventional Arms and Dual-Use Goods and Technologies is a multilateral export control regime (MECR) with 42 participating states including many former Comecon (Warsaw Pact) countries established in 1996.

The Wassenaar Arrangement was established to contribute to regional and international security and stability by promoting transparency and greater responsibility in transfers of conventional arms and dual-use goods and technologies, thus preventing destabilizing accumulations. Participating states seek, through their national policies, to ensure that transfers of these items do not contribute to the development or enhancement of military capabilities which undermine these goals, and are not diverted to support such capabilities.

It is the successor to the Cold War-era Coordinating Committee for Multilateral Export Controls (COCOM), and was established on 12 July 1996, in Wassenaar, the Netherlands, which is near The Hague. The Wassenaar Arrangement is considerably less strict than COCOM, focusing primarily on the transparency of national export control regimes and not granting veto power to individual members over organizational decisions. A Secretariat for administering the agreement is located in Vienna, Austria. Like COCOM, however, it is not a treaty, and therefore is not legally binding.

Every six months member countries exchange information on deliveries of conventional arms to non-Wassenaar members that fall under eight broad weapons categories: battle tanks, armoured fighting vehicles (AFVs), large-caliber artillery, military aircraft, military helicopters, warships, missiles or missile systems, and small arms and light weapons.

Control lists 
The outline of the arrangement is set out in a document entitled "Guidelines & Procedures, including the Initial Elements". The list of restricted technologies is broken into two parts, the "List of Dual-Use Goods and Technologies" (also known as the Basic List) and the "Munitions List". The Basic List is composed of ten categories based on increasing levels of sophistication:

 Category 1 – Special Materials and Related Equipment
 Category 2 – Materials Processing
 Category 3 – Electronics
 Category 4 – Computers
 Category 5 – Part 1 – Telecommunications
 Category 5 – Part 2 – Information Security
 Category 6 – Sensors and Lasers
 Category 7 – Navigation and Avionics
 Category 8 – Marine
 Category 9 – Aerospace and Propulsion

Basic List has two nested subsections—Sensitive and Very Sensitive. Items of the Very Sensitive List include materials for stealth technology—i.e., equipment that could be used for submarine detection, advanced radar, and jet engine technologies.

Within each of the categories, there are 5 types of controlled item.  These are approximately as follows:
 A – Physical Goods and components
 B – Plant, test equipment etc. for the production of the goods
 C – Materials typically from which the goods can be created
 D – Software used typically for the development, production or use of the goods
 E – Technology used typically for the development, production or use of the goods.
The types of item B, C, D and E typically refer to the type A items, but there are many exceptions, e.g. some materials may be controlled, even though there is no specific Good referred to.

The Wassenaar Arrangement List's categories are typically processed, and merged with other sources, e.g. Category 5.A.2 maps on to US ECCN 5A002, and EU control classification 5A002.

The Munitions List has 22 categories, which are not labeled.

In order for an item to be placed on the lists, Member States must take into account the following 
criteria:
 Foreign availability outside Participating States
 Ability to effectively control the export of the goods
 Ability to make a clear and objective specification of the item.
 Controlled by another regime, such as the Australia Group, Nuclear Suppliers Group, or Missile Technology Control Regime

Membership 
The 42 states that have been participating since December 2017 are: 
 
  
  
   
   
  
   
   
   
   
  
   
   
   
   
  
  
   
 
   
   
   
  
 
   
 
  
   
   
 
   
 
   
   
 
   
  
 
  
 
  
  

 – European Union member state.  – NATO member.

Admission requirements 
Admission requires states to:
 Be a producer or exporter of arms or sensitive industrial equipment
 Maintain non-proliferation policies and appropriate national policies, including adherence to:
 Non-proliferation policies, such as (where applicable) the Nuclear Suppliers Group, the Missile Technology Control Regime, and the Australia Group
 Treaty on the Non-Proliferation of Nuclear Weapons, the Biological Weapons Convention, the Chemical Weapons Convention and, where applicable, START I (including the Lisbon Protocol) 
 Maintain fully effective export controls

The Arrangement is open on a global and non-discriminatory basis to prospective adherents that comply with the agreed criteria. Admission of new members requires the consensus of all members.

India joined as the 42nd participating state on 7 December 2017. "Wassenaar Arrangement participating states reviewed the progress of a number of current membership applications and agreed at the plenary meeting to admit India which will become the Arrangement's 42nd participating state as soon as the necessary procedural arrangements for joining the WA are completed," the grouping said in a statement. India's application was supported by Russia, USA, France and Germany.

2013 amendments 
In December 2013, the list of export restricted technologies was amended to include internet-based surveillance systems. New technologies placed under the export control regime include "intrusion software"—software designed to defeat a computer or network's protective measures so as to extract data or information—as well as IP network surveillance systems.

The purpose of the amendments was to prevent Western technology companies from selling surveillance technology to governments known to abuse human rights. However, some technology companies have expressed concerns that the scope of the controls may be too broad, limiting security researchers' ability to identify and correct security vulnerabilities. Google and Facebook criticized the agreement for the restrictions it will place on activities like penetration testing, sharing information about threats, and bug bounty programs. They argue that the restrictions will weaken the security of participating nations and do little to curb threats from non-participant nations.

See also
 Arms Export Control Act
 Defense Security Cooperation Agency
 Export Control Classification Number
 International Traffic in Arms Regulations

References

External links

 Wassenaar Arrangement

Arms control treaties
Treaties establishing intergovernmental organizations
Export and import control
Treaties concluded in 1995
Treaties entered into force in 1996
Treaties of Argentina
Treaties of Australia
Treaties of Belgium
Treaties of Canada
Treaties of the Czech Republic
Treaties of Denmark
Treaties of Estonia
Treaties of Finland
Treaties of Ireland
Treaties of Japan
Treaties of Latvia
Treaties of Lithuania
Treaties of Luxembourg
Treaties of Malta
Treaties of Mexico
Treaties of New Zealand
Treaties of Norway
Treaties of South Korea
Treaties of Romania
Treaties of Slovakia
Treaties of Slovenia
Treaties of Sweden
Treaties of Turkey
Treaties of Ukraine
Treaties of the United Kingdom
Treaties of the United States
Treaties of France
Treaties of Germany
Treaties of Poland
Treaties of Italy
Treaties of Russia
Treaties of Portugal
Treaties of Spain
Treaties of the Netherlands
Treaties of Hungary
Treaties of Bulgaria
Treaties of Greece
Treaties of Croatia
Treaties of South Africa
Treaties of Austria
Treaties of Switzerland
Wassenaar
Organisations based in Vienna
International organisations based in Austria